Benjamin Evans or Ben Evans may refer to:
Benjamin F. Evans Jr., a US Army Major General 
Benjamin F. Evans Sr., a US Army Major General 
Benjamin Evans (Baptist minister) (1844–1900), Welsh clergyman and Secretary of the Baptist Missionary Society
Benjamin Evans, Baron Evans of Hungershall (1899–1982), British academic
Benjamin Evans (minister) (1740–1821), Welsh congregational minister
Ben Evans (born 1975), former international Wales rugby union player
Ben Evans (rugby league) (born 1992), Welsh rugby league player
Ben Evans (Sunset Beach), a character in the US soap opera Sunset Beach
Ben Evans (golfer) (born 1986), English golfer